KLTO (99.1 FM) is a radio station broadcasting a Spanish language Top 40 (CHR) format to the Waco-Temple, Texas area. The station is owned by Waco Entertainment Group, LLC The transmitter is near Flat, Texas in Coryell County.

Translator

References

External links

LTO (FM)
Contemporary hit radio stations in the United States
LTO (FM)